This is a list of all high schools or their equivalent in the state of Utah.

Beaver County
 Beaver County School District 
 Beaver High School - Beaver 
 Milford High School - Milford

Box Elder County
 Box Elder School District 
 Bear River High School - Garland 
 Box Elder High School - Brigham City 
 Dale Young Community High School - Brigham City

Cache County
 Cache County School District 
Cache High School - North Logan 
 Mountain Crest High School - Hyrum 
 Sky View High School - Smithfield 
 Green Canyon High School - North Logan, Utah 
 Ridgeline High School - Millville, Utah 
 Logan City School District 
 Logan High School - Logan 
 Logan High School South Campus - Logan 
 State charter and private
 Fast Forward Charter High School - Logan 
 InTech Collegiate High School - North Logan

Carbon County
 Carbon School District 
 Carbon High School - Price 
 East Carbon High School (closed) - East Carbon, Utah 
 Lighthouse Alternative - Price 
 State charter and private
 Notre Dame Catholic High School (closed)
 Pinnacle High School - Price

Daggett County
 Manila High School - Manila

Davis County
 Davis School District 
Bountiful High School - Bountiful 
 Canyon Heights School - Kaysville 
 Clearfield High School - Clearfield 
 Davis High School - Kaysville 
Farmington High School - Farmington 
Layton High School - Layton 
 Legacy Preparatory Academy - Woods Cross 
 Mountain High School - Kaysville 
Northridge High School - Layton 
Syracuse High School - Syracuse 
Viewmont High School - Bountiful 
Woods Cross High School - Woods Cross 
 State charter and private
Island View School - Syracuse

Duchesne County
 Duchesne County School District 
 Altamont High School - Altamont 
 Duchesne High School - Duchesne 
 Tabiona School - Tabiona 
 Union High School - Roosevelt

Emery County
 Emery County School District 
 Emery High School - Castle Dale 
 Green River High School - Green River

Garfield County
 Garfield County School District 
 Bryce Valley High School - Tropic 
 Escalante High School - Escalante 
 Panguitch High School - Panguitch

Grand County
 DayStar Adventist Academy - Castle Valley
 Grand County High School - Moab

Iron County
 Iron County School District 
 Canyon View High School - Cedar City 
 Cedar High School - Cedar City 
 Foothill High School - Cedar City 
 Parowan High School - Parowan 
 State charter and private
 SUCCESS Academy at Southern Utah University - Cedar City 
Havenwood Academy - Cedar City

Juab County
 Juab School District 
 Juab High School - Nephi 
 Tintic School District 
 Tintic High School - Eureka 
 West Desert High School - Trout Creek

Kane County
 Kane County School District 
 Kanab High School - Kanab 
 Valley High School - Orderville

Millard County
 Millard County School District 
 CBA Center - Delta - charter school within school district 
 Delta High School - Delta 
 EskDale High School - Eskdale 
 Millard High School - Fillmore

Morgan County
 Morgan High School - Morgan

Piute County
 Piute School District 
 Piute High School - Junction

Rich County
 Rich High School - Randolph

Salt Lake County
 Canyons School District 
 Alta High School - Sandy 
 Brighton High School - Cottonwood Heights 
 Hillcrest High School - Midvale 
 Jordan High School - Sandy 
 Corner Canyon High School - Draper 
 Granite School District 
 Cottonwood High School - Murray 
 Cyprus High School - Magna 
 Granger High School - West Valley City 
 Granite Peaks High School - South Salt Lake 
 Hunter High School - West Valley City 
 Kearns High School - Kearns 
 Olympus High School - Holladay 
 Skyline High School - Millcreek Township 
 Taylorsville High School - Taylorsville 
 Jordan School District 
 Bingham High School - South Jordan 
 Copper Hills High School - West Jordan 
 Herriman High School - Herriman
 Mountain Ridge High School - Herriman
 Riverton High School - Riverton 
 Valley High School - South Jordan 
 West Jordan High School - West Jordan 
 Murray City School District 
 Creekside High School - Murray 
 Murray High School - Murray 
 Salt Lake City School District 
 East High School - Salt Lake City 
 Highland High School - Salt Lake City 
 Horizonte High School - Salt Lake City 
 South High School - Salt Lake City - closed in 1988
 West High School - Salt Lake City 
 State charter and private
 Academy for Math, Engineering, and Science (AMES) - Murray - charter school attached to Cottonwood High School 
 American Heritage - South Jordan 
 American Preparatory Academy (APA) - West Valley City, Utah 
 Beehive Academy of Science and Technology - Sandy 
 City Academy - Salt Lake City 
 East Hollywood High School - West Valley City 
 Intermountain Christian School - Holladay 
 Itineris Early College High School - West Jordan 
 Juan Diego Catholic High School - Draper 
 Judge Memorial Catholic High School - Salt Lake City 
 Paradigm High School - South Jordan 
 Realms Of Inquiry - Salt Lake City 
 Rowland Hall-St. Mark's School - Salt Lake City 
 Salt Lake Center for Science Education (SLCSE) - Salt Lake City - charter school 
 Salt Lake School of the Performing Arts - Salt Lake City - charter school attached to Highland High School 
 Summit Academy High School - Bluffdale 
 Vista Private School (part of Vista Treatment Centers) - West Jordan 
 Waterford School - Sandy 
 Woodland Hills School - Murray

San Juan County
 San Juan School District 
Monticello High School - Monticello 
 Monument Valley High School - Monument Valley 
Navajo Mountain High School - Navajo Mountain 
 San Juan High School - Blanding 
 Whitehorse High School - Montezuma Creek

Sanpete County
 North Sanpete School District 
 North Sanpete High School - Mount Pleasant 
 South Sanpete School District 
 Gunnison Valley High School - Gunnison 
 Manti High School - Manti 
 Sanpete Academy - Ephraim 
 State charter and private
 Wasatch Academy - Mount Pleasant

Sevier County
 Sevier School District 
 Cedar Ridge High School - Richfield 
 North Sevier High School - Salina 
 Richfield High School - Richfield 
 South Sevier High School - Monroe

Summit County
 North Summit School District 
 North Summit High School - Coalville 
 Park City School District 
 Park City High School - Park City 
 Park City Learning Center - Park City 
 South Summit School District 
 South Summit High School - Kamas 
 The Winter Sports School in Park City

Tooele County
 Tooele County School District 
 Blue Peak High School - Tooele 
 Dugway High School - Dugway 
 Grantsville High School - Grantsville 
 Stansbury High School - Stansbury Park 
 Tooele High School - Tooele 
 Wendover High School - Wendover

Uintah County
 Uintah School District 
 Uintah High School - Vernal 
 Ute Tribe Education Department 
 Uintah River High School - Fort Duchesne

Utah County
 Alpine School District 
 American Fork High School - American Fork 
 Cedar Valley High School - Eagle Mountain 
 East Shore High School - Orem 
 Lehi High School - Lehi 
 Lone Peak High School - Highland 
 Mountain View High School - Orem 
 Orem High School - Orem 
 Pleasant Grove High School - Pleasant Grove 
 Skyridge High School - Lehi 
 Timpanogos High School - Orem  
 Westlake High School - Saratoga Springs 
 Nebo School District 
 Landmark High School - Spanish Fork 
 Maple Mountain High School - Spanish Fork 
 Payson High School - Payson 
 Salem Hills High School - Salem 
 Spanish Fork High School - Spanish Fork 
 Springville High School - Springville 
 Provo City School District 
 The Center for High School Studies - Provo 
 Independence High School - Provo 
 Provo High School - Provo 
 Slate Canyon School - Provo 
 Timpview High School - Provo 
 State charter and private
 American Heritage School - American Fork
 American Leadership Academy - Spanish Fork 
 Brigham Young High School - Provo - closed in 1968 
 Heritage School - Provo 
 Discovery Academy - Provo 
 Liahona Academy - Pleasant Grove 
 Liberty Academy - Salem 
 Lumen Scholar Institute - Orem 
 Merit Academy - Springville 
 New Haven School - Provo 
 Park City Independent, Orem 
 Rockwell Charter High School - Eagle Mountain 
 Utah County Academy of Sciences (UCAS) - Orem - charter school at Utah Valley University, in cooperation with the Alpine, Nebo, and Provo School Districts 
 Walden School of Liberal Arts - Provo

Wasatch County
 Wasatch County School District 
 Wasatch High School - Heber City 195]
 Wasatch Alternative High School - Heber City

Washington County
 Washington County School District 
 Crimson Cliffs High School - St. George
Desert Hills High School - St. George
Dixie High School - St. George 
Enterprise High School - Enterprise 
Hurricane High School - Hurricane 
 Millcreek High School - St. George 
Pine View High School - St. George 
Snow Canyon High School - St. George 
 State charter and private
 SUCCESS Academy at Dixie State College - St. George 
 Tuacahn High School for the Performing Arts - Ivins 
 Diamond Ranch Academy

Wayne County
 Wayne High School - Bicknell

Weber County
 Ogden City School District 
 Ben Lomond High School - Ogden 
 Millcreek High School - Ogden 
 Ogden High School - Ogden 
 Washington High School - Ogden 
 Weber County School District 
 Bonneville High School - Ogden 
 Canyon High School - Ogden 
 Fremont High School - Plain City 
 Roy High School - Roy 
 Two Rivers High School - Ogden 
 Weber Innovations High School - Ogden 
 Weber High School (grades 9-12), - Ogden 
 State charter and private
 DaVinci Academy of Science and the Arts (grades 9-12), Ogden 
 NUAMES Early College High School 
 St. Joseph Catholic High School - Ogden 
 Venture High School (grades 9-12) - Marriott-Slaterville

See also

 List of school districts in Utah

References

 School Directory from the State of Utah Office of Education

External links

 Official website for the State of Utah Office of Education

 
Utah
High schools in Utah